Out to Swim is a British swimming, water polo and synchro club for gay men, lesbians, bisexuals, transgender people and their friends. The club also accepts straight men and women. The club was founded by AGM when the name was agreed in March 1992.  In 2006 "Out to swim Brighton" was formed in Brighton and Hove and 2018 "Out To Swim West" in Bristol.

Inspired by the swimming teams at the Gay Games in Vancouver in 1990, the club has competed at national and international competitions; it has expanded to include a synchronized swimming team, and regularly competes in open water events. Their first annual swimming competition was held in 1997 and attracted 23 gay and straight teams from all over Europe.

In June 2012 a team of six members from the club swam the English Channel for charity.

The club is also one of the few aquatics clubs in the world that offers men participation in synchronised swimming.  In 2012 the club were part of a campaign for men to be allowed to compete in synchronized swimming at the 2012 Summer Olympics.  Synchronised swimming is one of only two Olympic sports that discriminate on the basis of gender.

Out To Swim is a member of the International Gay & Lesbian Aquatics association.

References

External links
Official website

1992 establishments in the United Kingdom
LGBT sports organisations in the United Kingdom
Sports clubs established in 1992
Sports clubs in London
Swimming clubs